Cross-country skiing at the 2022 European Youth Olympic Winter Festival was held from 21 to 25 March at Vuokatti Sport Biathlon Stadium in Vuokatti, Finland.

Competition schedule

Medal summary

Medal table

Boys' events

Girls' events

Mixed event

References 

2022
European Youth Olympic Winter Festival
2022 European Youth Olympic Winter Festival events